Anthology: Set the World Afire is the third greatest hits album by Megadeth. It was released on September 30, 2008, through Capitol Records. It is a two-disc set with additional songs not offered in previous compilations including demos, live performances and unreleased tracks. The album's name refers to the second song of the band's third studio album, So Far, So Good... So What!.

The album was apparently supposed to include the track "Sleepwalker" from the previous year's release, United Abominations, but this was replaced by "Foreclosure of a Dream" from Countdown to Extinction instead, resulting in that track being the exception on the otherwise chronological track listing of the album. There are also a number of mistakes in the credits of the release including track listings, previous releases and lineup of then-current and previous members stating guitarist Glen Drover as a current member at the time of release as Chris Broderick had already joined the band replacing the former earlier in the year prior to the actual release of the album.

Anthology: Set the World Afire sold about 2600 copies in the U.S. in its first week.

Track listing
All music and lyrics by Dave Mustaine, except where noted.

Personnel
Dave Mustaine – guitars, lead vocals on all tracks
Marty Friedman – guitars on tracks 10–17 disc one and 1–13 and 16–18 disc two
Chris Poland – guitars on tracks 1–5 on disc one
Al Pitrelli – guitars on tracks 14 and 15 on disc two
Jeff Young – guitars on tracks 6–9 on disc one
David Ellefson – bass, backing vocals on all tracks
Nick Menza – drums on tracks 10–17 on disc one and 1–11 and 16–18 disc two
Gar Samuelson – drums on tracks 1–5 on disc one
Jimmy DeGrasso – drums on tracks 12–15 on disc two
Chuck Behler – drums on tracks 6–9 on disc one
Evren Göknar - mastering engineer (capitol mastering)

References

2008 greatest hits albums
Megadeth compilation albums